Marianne Louise Hagan (born December 8, 1966) is an American actress and writer. She played Kara Strode in the 1995 horror sequel Halloween: The Curse of Michael Myers, her film debut.

Personal life
Hagan was born to Louise and James Hagan in New York City and was raised in Pocantico Hills, a small hamlet within the town on Mount Pleasant in New York. She has three sisters, Victoria, Christine and Joanna. She graduated cum laude with a B.A. in political science from Duke University.

For many years, Hagan resided in New York City and in March 2016 she returned to Mount Pleasant, where she currently resides in Sleepy Hollow.

Career

Acting career
Hagan's first feature is one she is best known for among horror fans, her role as Kara Strode in the 1995 horror sequel Halloween: The Curse of Michael Myers, her character is an adopted cousin of original Halloween character Laurie Strode. She appeared at the convention for Halloween: 25 Years of Terror event in 2003.  In 2006 she appeared in the horror film Dead Calling alongside fellow Halloween cast members, Ellie Cornell of Halloween 4: The Return of Michael Myers & Halloween 5: The Revenge of Michael Myers, P.J. Soles of Halloween, Charles Cyphers of Halloween & Halloween II, and Brad Loree of Halloween: Resurrection.  Most recently she has appeared in horror films Stake Land, which stars Danielle Harris also of Halloween 4 & Halloween 5, and BreadCrumbs.  She has also appeared in Dinner and a Movie, in which she played the lead role, I Think I Do, and Rick, which stars Bill Pullman.

Her television credits include Who's the Boss?, which was her debut as an actress, Major Dad, SeaQuest DSV, Law & Order, Law & Order: Criminal Intent, Law & Order: Special Victims Unit, and Friends in which she played a friend of Rachel's.

She has also starred in theater productions including Inky at the Julia Miles Theatre/ Women's Project Theater, in which she played the character of "Barbara".  She has appeared in several other productions including Fiction, Mercy, The Country Club, Skyscraper and In Heat.

Other work
As a journalist, Hagan has written pieces for the arts and culture magazines, including BlackBook (for whom she interviewed such figures as Lou Reed) and Room 100.  She is the author of the book, Victoria Hagan: Interior Portraits, which was released on October 12, 2010. Marianne and her sister Victoria appeared on The Martha Stewart Show, as part of the episode titled "The Sisters Show", in which they talked about the book.

Filmography

Film

Television

Theatre
 Inky, by Rinne Groff, directed by Loretta Greco—The Julia Miles Theater/The Women's Project
 Fiction, by Steven Dietz, directed by David Warren—The McCarter Theatre
 Mercy, by Laura Cahill, directed by Loretta Greco—The Vineyard Theater
 The Country Club, by Douglas Carter Beane, directed by Christopher Ashley—The Long Wharf Theater
 Skyscraper, by David Auburn, directed by Michael Rego—The Greenwich Hous Theater/The Acara Group
 In Heat, by Malcolm Danare, directed by James Eckhouse—The Lost Studio

Books

References

External links
 

1966 births
Actresses from New York (state)
American stage actresses
American film actresses
American television actresses
Duke University Trinity College of Arts and Sciences alumni
Living people
People from Mount Pleasant, New York
21st-century American women